St. Peterzell is a municipality in the Wahlkreis (constituency) of Toggenburg in the canton of St. Gallen in Switzerland.

It was an independent municipality until January 1, 2009, when it merged with Brunnadern and Mogelsberg to form the municipality of Neckertal.

References

External links

 Official website 

Municipalities of the canton of St. Gallen